The New York Hall of Science, also known as NYSCI, is a science museum located in Flushing Meadows-Corona Park in the New York City borough of Queens, in the section of the park that is in Corona. It occupies one of the few remaining structures from the 1964 New York World's Fair, and is New York City's only hands-on science and technology center. The more than 400 hands-on exhibits focus on biology, chemistry, and physics.

History 

The museum was established in 1964 as part of the 1964 World's Fair in Flushing Meadows-Corona Park, and at the time was one of only a few science museums in existence. Unlike many other institutions, which were closed immediately or soon after the Fair, the Hall remained open after the fair, and served as a resource for students. Its exhibits at the time were somewhat limited but included plans for the world's first atomarium open to the public.

The Hall remained open for 15 years, but in 1979 it was closed for major renovations, not to reopen until 1983 at the earliest. By May 1982, according to a New York Daily News article at the time, the condition of the museum had deteriorated to such a state that "paint peels from the Saturn V and Apollo hulls, and graffiti adorn the walls around the space park; chipped cement and scattered stones fill the moat beneath the hall". At the time, even though renovations were completed in 1983, city funding for the museum was severed because only $40,000 out of $8 million of promised funding had been raised.

In 1984, New York City hired physicist Alan J. Friedman to help with the museum's transition from a focus on science fiction-type exhibits that predicted the future, to relevance to everyday lives of ordinary citizens. At the time Friedman was appointed, the museum was basically an empty shell, having "an inch of water on the floor. All the exhibits had been given away. Even the light fixtures had been yanked out of the wall”, but renovations continued. After it reopened in 1986, giving New York City a science museum for the first time since it had closed seven years earlier, plans for the display of an atom were realized with a $40,000 exhibit for a quantum atom that was a part of a $400,000 expansion and renovation at the museum. The museum's growth and ability to draw crowds was unexpected and led to the city's pursuit of further funds and expansion.

At the time of its re-opening, the museum was unique in that it also provided a training program for science majors who could then go on to study under a tuition waiver program at nearby Queens College  in exchange for committing to spend at least two years in city schools who needed science educators.

The museum's role in the life of city school children continued, and in 1991 it announced plans for a ten-year, $80 million renovation and expansion to be able to meet the needs of a growing visitorship. Further expansion, which included a new entrance rotunda, driveway, cafe, gift shop and theater, as well as a  science playground, began in 1996 and reflected the need for constant updates in science museums to keep their displays up to date and relevant. In recognition of its continued upgrading, the Hall was granted the status of a New York City cultural institution, given to a limited number of organizations.

Like most museums in New York, the Hall of Science spent much of 2020–2021 closed to the public due to the coronavirus pandemic.  The museum reopened in July 2021, but closed soon after in September due to flooding damage from Hurricane Ida.  The museum reopened in February 2022.

Funding
In 2005, the Hall was among 406 New York City arts and social service institutions to receive part of a $20 million grant from the Carnegie Corporation, which had been made possible through a donation by New York City mayor Michael Bloomberg. The Hall has  continued to receive funding from a number of sources essential to its operation and expansion. This represented a welcome change for the museum from the 1990s during which severe cuts in funding threatened its ability to operate successfully.

Exhibits
The Hall mainly focuses on education for children ages 1–17 and its audience consists primarily of city children for whom the exposure to science is something new. The museum includes a large permanent collection as well as a range of travelling exhibitions. Although somewhat more common now, the museum was among the first to have its young visitors assess its exhibits and it welcomed their feedback in preparation for the re-opening in 1986. The Hall's permanent exhibitions include:

Gingerbread Lane
Hidden Kingdoms: The World of Microbes
Mathematica: A World of Numbers... and Beyond
Preschool Place
Rocket Park
Science Playground
Science Technology Library
The Search for Life Beyond the Earth
Seeing the Light
Sound Sensations: The Inside Story of Audio
The Sports Challenge
Technology Gallery
Amateur Radio Station

Gallery

References

External links

 nywf64.com (1964/1965 New York World's Fair Website)

Museums in Queens, New York
1964 New York World's Fair
Science museums in New York City
Aerospace museums in New York (state)
Flushing, Queens
Flushing Meadows–Corona Park
Association of Science-Technology Centers member institutions
Transportation museums in New York City
1964 establishments in New York City
Corona, Queens
Children's museums in New York City
New York Hall of Science